Imagine may refer to:

 Imagination

Music

Albums
 Imagine (Armin van Buuren album), 2008
 Imagine (Eva Cassidy album), 2002
 Imagine (Janice Vidal album), 2012
 Imagine (John Lennon album), 1971
 Imagine: John Lennon (soundtrack), 1988
 Imagine (Mort Shuman album), 1976
 Imagine, a 1997 album by 14 Karat Soul
 Imagine, a 2000 album by Aaron Benward
 Imagine, a 1993 album by Gonzalo Rubalcaba
 Imagine, a 1995 album by Keiko Lee
 Imagine, a 2004 album by Minmi
 Imagine, a 1996 album by Ofra Harnoy
 Imagine, a 1989 album by Sébastien El Chato
 Imagine, a 2008 album by Vox Angeli

Songs
 "Imagine" (Ariana Grande song), 2018
 "Imagine" (John Lennon song), 1971
 "Imagine" (Shola Ama song), 1999
 "Imagine" (Snoop Dogg song), 2006
 "Imagine" (Tone Damli song), 2012
 "Imagine", a song by Armin van Buuren from Imagine, 2008
 "Imagine", a song by Doja Cat from Planet Her, 2021
 "Imagine", a song by Salt-n-Pepa from Brand New, 1997
 "Imagine", a 1969 song by Argosy
 "Imagine", a song by Daniël Sahuleka
 "Imagine", a song by Sébastien El Chato
 "Imagine", a song from the film Athena
 "Imagine", a song from the film The Bobo
 "Imagine", a song by Christ Crosby from the film Flipper's New Adventure
 "I Can Only Imagine" (MercyMe song) or "Imagine", 1999

Film and television
 Imagine (1972 film), a film by John Lennon and Yoko Ono
 Imagine (1986 film), a short film by Zbigniew Rybczyński
 Imagine (2012 film), a Polish film
 Imagine (TV series), a BBC arts show
 Imagine Entertainment, a production company founded by Brian Grazer and Ron Howard
 Imagine Film Festival, a film festival in Amsterdam, Netherlands
 Imagine: John Lennon, a 1988 documentary film
 Imagine TV, a former Indian TV channel

Games
 Imagine (video game series), a series of Nintendo DS and Wii games
 Shin Megami Tensei: Imagine, a MMORPG
 Imagine Software, a UK video game company

Books and magazines
Imagine (book), a book by Alan McCombes and Tommy Sheridan
 Imagine: How Creativity Works, a 2012 book by Jonah Lehrer
 Imagine (game magazine), an adventure games magazine
 Imagine (educational magazine), an educational periodical for 7th-12th graders
 Imagine Publishing, a UK-based magazine publisher
 Imagine!, an American book publisher
 Imagine, a 1970s comics magazine published by Star Reach
 Imagine, a journal by the Socialist Party of Canada

Other uses
 Imagine (horse), an Irish Thoroughbred racehorse
 Imagine (3D modeling software), a 3D modeling and ray tracing program
 Imagine Communications, an Irish ISP and telephone operator
 Imagine Communications Corporation, a television technology company
 imagine (Brunei telecommunications company), a Bruneian ISP and telephone operator

See also
 Ikarus Imagine, a German hang glider design
 Imagen, a Puerto Rican fashion magazine
 Imaginary (disambiguation)
 Imagine... A Fantasy in the Sky, a fireworks show at the Disneyland Resort in California, U.S.
 Imago (disambiguation)
 Imajin, American contemporary R&B band
 Imajin (album), eponymous album from the band